The Catholic Bishops' Conference of England and Wales (CBCEW) is the episcopal conference of the Catholic Church in England and Wales.

Overview
The Catholic Bishops' Conference of England and Wales is the permanent assembly of Catholic Bishops and Personal Ordinaries in the two member countries. The membership of the Conference comprises the Archbishops, Bishops and Auxiliary Bishops of the 22 Dioceses within England and Wales, the Bishop of the Forces (Military Ordinariate), the Apostolic Eparch of the Ukrainian Church in Great Britain, the Ordinary of the Personal Ordinariate of Our Lady of Walsingham, and the Apostolic Prefect of the Falkland Islands.

Structure

President Vincent Nichols, Cardinal Archbishop of Westminster
Vice-President Malcolm McMahon, Archbishop of Liverpool
General Secretary Christopher Thomas, Diocese of Nottingham
Membership
Diocesan, auxiliary and emeritus (retired) bishops of England and Wales
Syro-Malabar Catholic Church Eparch 
Ukrainian Catholic Church Eparch 
Ordinary of the Personal Ordinariate of Our Lady of Walsingham

Departments
The conference is divided into departments each dealing with specific topic matters. There are seven departments, these being:

Christian Life and Worship
Education and Formation
Social Justice
Dialogue and Unity
Evangelisation and Discipleship
International Affairs 

Each department consists of bishops and staff, and is chaired by one bishop. Other bishops contribute as episcopal staff, and there are a few other members serving as staff. Each department is further subdivided into committees; a separate member of the episcopal staff of that department oversees the reports and work of their committee.

Other agencies
Other agencies of the Bishops' Conference include:
CAFOD, - Catholic Agency for Overseas Development - the international development and humanitarian agency
CSAN, the social action agency - "CSAN (Caritas Social Action Network) is the social action arm of the Catholic Church in England and Wales"
Catholic Education Service
CYMFED - Catholic Youth Ministry Federation. CYMFed is recognised and supported by the Catholic Bishops’ Conference of England and Wales. It is also a member of the Department for Catechesis and Evangelisation.

See also
Bishops' Conference of Scotland
Catholic Church in England

References

External links
Catholic Bishops' Conference of England and Wales official website
 Catholic News  official website
Bishops’ Conference of England and Wales webpage. GCatholic website
 CAFOD
 Caritas - Social Action
 Catholic Association
 Catholic Education Service

England
Bishops' Conference